The Essential Ramblin' Jack Elliott is a compilation album by American folk musician Ramblin' Jack Elliott, released in 1976. It was originally issued as a double LP including Elliot's only Vanguard release Jack Elliott and other live tracks. The album was reissued on CD in 1998.

Track listing 
All songs Traditional unless otherwise noted.
"Roving Gambler" – 3:36
"Will the Circle Be Unbroken" – 2:38
"Diamond Joe" – 2:58
"Guabi Guabi" (Traditional, Jack Elliott) – 4:43
"Sowing on the Mountain" – 2:15
"Roll on Buddy" – 2:03
"1913 Massacre" (Woody Guthrie) – 3:51
"House of the Rising Sun" – 3:28
"Shade of the Old Apple Tree" – 2:41
"Black Snake Moan" – 3:26
"Portland Town" (Derroll Adams) – 1:59
"More Pretty Girls Than One" – 2:14
Double LP and CD reissue live tracks:
"San Francisco Bay Blues" (Jesse Fuller) – 2:15
"Buffalo Skinners" – 4:51
"Sadie Brown" – 3:30
"Don't Think Twice, It's All Right" (Bob Dylan) – 4:13
"Blind Lemon Jefferson" (Lead Belly) – 3:55
"Ramblin' Round Your City" (Guthrie) – 3:50
"Tennessee Stud" (Jimmy Driftwood) – 4:14
"Night Herding Song" – 3:20
"Lovesick Blues" (Cliff Friend, Irving Mills) – 3:17
"I Belong to Glasgow" (William Fyffe) – 5:31

Personnel
Ramblin' Jack Elliott – vocals, harmonica, guitar

References

External links
Ramblin' Jack Elliott Discography

1976 greatest hits albums
Ramblin' Jack Elliott compilation albums
Vanguard Records compilation albums
Albums produced by Maynard Solomon